Éditions du Cerf (French: "Editions of the Deer") is a French publishing house specializing in religious books.  It was founded in 1929, and operated by the Dominican Order.

The name is a reference to Psalm 42 (41):

     As the hart panteth after the fountains of water; 
              so my soul panteth after thee, O God.

History
Editions du Cerf was founded in 1929 at the request of Pope Pius XI, by Father Marie-Vincent Bernadot.

Father Bernadot had already founded a journal, La Vie spirituelle ("The Spiritual Life"), with a goal to return Christian spirituality to its true sources of Holy Scripture, the Church Fathers and the great mystics. Following this, in 1928, he and other intellectuals such as Jacques Maritain founded La Vie Intellectuelle ("The Intellectual Life"), seeking to promote authentically depoliticized Catholic reflection  in response to Charles Maurras and his far-right monarchist movement Action Française (condemned by the Holy See in 1926) and also to Marxist ideologies.

Bernadot's brief was to "judge events in the unchanging and living light of a Christianity disengaged from conformity to the fashions of the times, where it can find itself smothered to the point of paralysis; and to cause the truth to shine, to make the message of Christ heard when it becomes obscured by the power of routine, timidity, or compromise." With this mandate, the publishing house was founded, on October 11, 1929, at Juvisy-sur-Orge. In 1937, the offices were moved to Paris, at 29 Boulevard La Tour-Maubourg, in the same buildings that contain the convent of Saint Dominic. Since 2011 Editions du Cerf operates from 24 Rue des Tanneries in the 13th arrondissement, in buildings shared with the Dominican St. Jacques convent.

Some authors published by Editions du Cerf 

Some Fathers or Doctors of the Church, some blessed or saints, for example :

Apostolic Fathers, Augustine of Hippo, Anselm of Canterbury, Thomas Aquinas, Origen, Gregory of Nazianzus, Gregory of Nyssa, Teresa of Ávila, Catherine of Siena, Francis of Assisi, Basil of Caesarea, Eusebius of Caesarea, Pope Leo I, Pope John XXIII, Teresa of Lisieux, John of the Cross, Ambrose, Pope Gregory I, Clement of Alexandria, Tertullian, Bernard of Clairvaux, Hildegard of Bingen, etc.

Some philosophers and writers, for example :

Aristotle, Meister Eckhart, Dante Alighieri, Thomas Cajetan, Nicolas of Cusa, Pierre de Bérulle, Christina of Sweden, Immanuel Kant, Georg Wilhelm Friedrich Hegel, Jean-Baptiste Henri Lacordaire, Edmund Husserl, Martin Heidegger, Simone Weil, Michel de Montaigne, Gotthold Ephraim Lessing, Friedrich Wilhelm Joseph Schelling, Jacques Lacan, Karl-Otto Apel, Walter Benjamin, Carl Schmitt, Ernst Cassirer, Ernst Troeltsch, Friedrich Schleiermacher, Ludwig Feuerbach, Félix Ravaisson, Johann Gottlieb Fichte, Charles Sanders Peirce, Max Weber, Dilthey, Nikolai Berdyaev, Hermann Cohen, Salomon Maimon, Paul Natorp, Hans Jonas, Augusto del Noce, Jean Nabert, Thomas Merton, Edith Stein, Leo Strauss, etc.

Some contemporary authors, for example :

Paul Ricoeur, Gianni Vattimo, Jean-Marie Déchanet, Emmanuel Lévinas, Jocelyn Benoist, Jean Greisch, Maxence Caron, Bernard Bonnejean, Olivier-Thomas Venard, Rémi Brague, Dominique Dubarle, Yves Congar, Henri de Lubac, Jean-Louis Chrétien, Stanislas Breton, Michel Henry, Francis Kaplan, Pierre Magnard, Pierre Caye, Jean-François Marquet, Dominique Noguez, Charles Taylor, Habermas, Jean-Luc Marion, Jean-François Courtine, Pierre-Henri Tavoillot, Alexis Philonenko, François Marty, Ernst Tugendhat, Maurice de Gandillac, Chantal Delsol, Jean Granier, Michel Corbin, Manlio Simonetti etc.

See also
Order of Friars Preachers
Sources Chrétiennes
La Bible d'Alexandrie
 Maxence Caron
 Claude Geffré

References

This article was translated from the French language Wikipedia.

External links
 
Interview with Jean-Nicolas Sed, CEO of Éditions du Cerf, Dec. 21, 2006 (French)

Book publishing companies of France
Dominican Order
Publishing companies established in 1929
Catholic publishing companies